Denne is a surname. Notable people with the surname include:

 David Denne (1799–1861), English cricketer
 Henry Denne, English clergyman and controversialist
 Lambert Denne (1831–1898), English soldier and cricketer
 Thomas Denne (1808–1876), English cricketer
 Vincent Denne, English politician, MP for Canterbury
 Wayne Denne, field hockey player